1976 in professional wrestling describes the year's events in the world of professional wrestling.

List of notable promotions 
These promotions held notable shows in 1976.

Calendar of notable shows

Awards and honors

Pro Wrestling Illustrated

Notable incidents
 Muhammad Ali vs. Antonio Inoki

Championship changes

EMLL

NWA

Births

 January 9:
Pasión Kristal (d. 2021) 
Todd Grisham 
January 10 - Donovan Morgan 
 January 23 – Nigel McGuinness
 January 24 - Chikayo Nagashima 
 January 25 - Gorgeous George 
 January 28 - Emiko Kado (d. 1999) 
 February 2 - Dragon Kid 
 February 15 - Yinling 
 February 23 - Muhammad Yone
 February 24 – Monster Clown
 March 6 – Ken Anderson/Mr. Kennedy
 March 16 - Carlos Amano
 March 18 - Mike Quackenbush 
 March 21 - El Hijo de Cien Caras (d. 2010)
 March 23 - Tyson Tomko
 March 28 - Rory McAllister 
 April 8 - Ryuji Ito 
 April 16 – Phil Baroni
 May 9 - Shawn Osborne (died in 2011) 
 May 22 - Yumi Fukawa 
 June 11 - MsChif
 June 11 - Sonoko Kato 
 June 13 - Sicodelico Jr.
 June 30 - Gilbert Yvel
 July 16 – Bobby Lashley
 August 10 - Amish Roadkill 
 August 15 - The Bruiser (died in 2020)
 September 10 – Matt Morgan
 September 23 - Yoshinobu Kanemaru 
 September 24 – Stephanie McMahon
 September 25 - Dr. Heresy 
 October 4 - Emi Sakura
 October 14 - G. Q. Money
 October 18 - Maybach Taniguchi 
 November 13 – Hiroshi Tanahashi
 November 17- Kikutaro
 November 21 - Cassidy O'Reilly
 November 22 - Lash LeRoux 
 November 23 – Kristina Laum
 November 25 – Adam Firestorm (d. 2009) 
 November 26 – Maven
 December 17 - Nosawa Rongai
 December 23 – Jamie Noble
 December 27 - Tim Arson (d. 2015)

Debuts
 Uncertain debut date
 Bret Hart
 Bobby Eaton
 Kevin Von Erich
 Barry Orton
 Ricky Steamboat
 Paul Orndorff 

May - Bobby Eaton 
May 24 - Super Parka

Retirements
 Mitsu Arakawa (1953 – 1976)
 Bob Geigel (1950 – 1976)
 George Gordienko (1946 – 1976)
 Danny Hodge (1959-1976, wrestled one match in 1983) 
 Stan Kowalski (1948 – 1976)
 Betty Niccoli (1963 – 1976)
 Antonino Rocca (1942 – 1976)
 Hans Schmidt (1949 – 1976)
 Kinji Shibuya (1952 – 1976)

Deaths
 April 21 - Sir Dudley Clements, 28
 May 20 - Bobby Pearce (rower), 70
 June 11 - Toots Mondt, 82
 July 27 - Sam Bass (wrestler), 41
 September 26 - Sheik Ali, 49
 November 10 - Al Haft, 89

References

 
professional wrestling